Ève Brenner (born 11 September 1941) is a French opera singer notable for her voice that spanned five octaves.

Early life 
Brenner was born in Saint-Chartier in central France where her parents who were both musicians and refugees were living. Her father, Ludwig Brenner, who was of Jewish-German descent, was captured and deported during World War II. He died in captivity in 1942 leaving her mother Jeanne alone to raise their children.

When the family returned to Paris at the end of the war, her mother rejoined her orchestra and left her children in the care of their grandparents. Aged 14, Brenner left school to join her mother's orchestra.

Music career 
Brenner studied opera at the Conservatoire de Paris from the age of 20. She sang in films, including Manon des Sources. She released several singles and EPs from the 1970s onward. He single "Morning on the River" peaked at number 96 in Australia in February 1979.

Singles and EPs
 Le matin sur la rivière, 1976, Pathé 
 La sicilienne, 1977, Pathé
 L'enfant, 1979, Pathé
 A comme Amour, 1979, Delphine Records
 Memories, 1980, Pathé
 "Hymne", 1980, Kébec-Disque
 Amoureuse, 1981, Philips/Phonogram
 Au nom de l'amour, Delphine Records
 Le rêve d’Ève, 1984, Philips/Phonogram
 Ave Maria Norma, 1985, Carrier
 Keep going, 1987, CBS

References

20th-century French women opera singers
1941 births
People from Indre
Living people